Adum is suburb of Kumasi. Kumasi is the regional capital of the Ashanti Region of Ghana.  Adum is a commercial area with some residential  areas. It is in the centre of the regional capital. Adum is a town in the Ashanti Region and it is the central business area of Kumasi. Adum is located between Bantama and Nhyiaso. Most people refer to Adum as Kumasi.

Notable places 

 Kumasi Fort and Military Museum
 Adum Prisons Yard
 Kuffour Clinic
 Ashanti Regional Headquarters

References 

Kumasi
Ashanti Region